Damen Keoki Wheeler (born September 3, 1977) is a former American football cornerback for the New York/New Jersey Hitmen, Jacksonville Jaguars and Los Angeles Avengers.

Professional career
Wheeler played one year in the XFL for the New York/New Jersey Hitmen. He posted three interceptions and 42 tackles, and was an All-XFL first-team selection. He played for the Jacksonville Jaguars in 2001. He played for the Los Angeles Avengers of the Arena Football League from 2003 to 2008.

Wheeler is married with four kids. He has two brothers and three sisters. He attended Valley High School in Sacramento and then went on to the University of Colorado at Boulder. He was then drafted by the San Diego Chargers in the sixth round in the 2000 NFL Draft.

References

External links
Just Sports Stats
Los Angeles Avengers player page
AFL stats
NFL.com player page

1977 births
Living people
Players of American football from Sacramento, California
American football cornerbacks
Colorado Buffaloes football players
Jacksonville Jaguars players
Los Angeles Avengers players
New York/New Jersey Hitmen players